Bless This House is an American sitcom television series created by Bruce Helford, which starred Andrew Dice Clay and Cathy Moriarty that aired on CBS from September 11, 1995, until January 17, 1996. The show is completely unrelated to the more successful British sitcom of the same name.

Plot
Postal worker Burt Clayton and his wife Alice raise two children in Trenton, New Jersey.

Cast
 Andrew Dice Clay (credited as Andrew Clay) as Burt Clayton
 Cathy Moriarty as Alice Clayton (Burt's wife)
 Raegan Kotz as Danielle "Danny" Clayton (their daughter)
 Sam Gifaldi as Sean Clayton (their son)
 Molly Price as Phyllis
 Don Stark as Lenny

Episodes

Reception
The Rochester Democrat and Chronicle gave the show a favorable review, saying, "it really does remind you of Jackie Gleason and The Honeymooners, without trying to copy that classic. There could be life after Dice; this kinder, gentler Andrew Clay seems like a pretty decent guy." The Los Angeles Times also gave it favorable notice, writing, "Bless This House doesn't quite blow you away, but it's a pleasant half-hour with likable characters and enough start-up humor to make you optimistic about its future."

Other reviews were mixed. Entertainment Weekly gave the show a C, writing, "Bless has smart things to say about how hardworking parents manage family life, but the show is hobbled by its endless succession of squalid sex jokes." People gave the show a C+, praising the performances of Clay and Moriarty, but concluding "Bless This House is the first TV show I’ve ever seen that would work better on radio." Variety wrote, "Director Barnet Kellman bounces laugh lines along at a brisk clip [...] Creator Bruce Helford’s writing is often ham-handed [...] Clay’s acting is awkward and forced, but Moriarty’s a treasure [...] Though Bless looks to be trying to carbon The Honeymooners, its closest relative would seem to be Married... with Children." TV Guide ranked Bless This House number 48 on their 50 Worst Shows of All Time list in 2002.

References

External links

CBS original programming
1990s American sitcoms
1995 American television series debuts
1996 American television series endings
Television shows set in New Jersey
Television series by Warner Bros. Television Studios
Television series created by Bruce Helford
Television series by Mohawk Productions